Gavin Claxton (born 19 July 1966, in Derby, England) is a British producer, screenwriter and director of the feature film comedy The All Together starring Martin Freeman and Danny Dyer. He is also producer, co-writer and performer - providing the voices of Freddie Mercury & Kurt Cobain - of the British television comedy series House of Rock and series producer, writer & director of numerous comedy and entertainment series on British television.

References

External links
 

English television producers
English screenwriters
English male screenwriters
English film directors
People from Derby
1966 births
Living people